Silver Medallion may refer to:

 Silver Retirement Medallion of the U.S. Central Intelligence Agency
 Telluride Film Festival Silver Medallion
 Shingo Silver Medallion, one of the Shingo Prize for Operational Excellence
Silver Medallion (horse), winner of the 1990 Shadwell Turf Mile Stakes

See also
 Silver (disambiguation)
 Medallion (disambiguation)
 Gold Medallion (disambiguation)
 Bronze Medallion (disambiguation)
 Silver medal